Oxygen demand is an environmental chemistry term that may refer to:

Biochemical oxygen demand (BOD), the amount of oxygen needed by organisms to break down organic material present in a water sample
Carbonaceous biochemical oxygen demand (CBOD), the amount of oxygen needed to break down carbon compounds, excluding nitrogen compounds
Chemical and biological oxygen demand, the combination of biochemical (BOD) and chemical oxygen demand (COD)
Chemical oxygen demand (COD), a test commonly used to indirectly measure the amount of organic compounds in a water sample
Nitrogenous oxygen demand (NOD), the amount of oxygen required to break down nitrogenous compounds in a water sample, like ammonia
Theoretical oxygen demand (ThOD), the calculated amount of oxygen required to oxidize a compound to its final oxidation products